On March 8, 2011, the United States House of Representatives created the 'Wounded to Work' Congressional Caucus' under the leadership of Congressmen Mike Conaway (R-TX), Robert Andrews (D-NJ), Scott Rigell (R-VA)  and Congresswoman Madeleine Z. Bordallo (D-GM).  The Wounded to Work Caucus is the first Congressional Caucus to deal with the needs of active duty military personnel who have been wounded in the service of their nation.  The Caucus and its volunteers will be promoting employment, through Congressional internships or shadowing, as appropriate, and the education and training of military personnel.  The final goal is to provide support for the creation and development of education and training programs within the private sector in order to expand the employability of participating military personnel. 

The program was the brain child of Edward J. Gerety and Gary Goosman. Gerety had a father in the US Marine Corps, and that is where it began.

References

External links 
 Caucus' Congressional Home page 
 Bio for Congresswoman Bordallo listing Caucus 
 Congressional Member Lists 

American veterans' organizations
Caucuses of the United States Congress